The 2008 Campeonato Brasileiro Série A was the 52nd edition of the Campeonato Brasileiro Série A. It began on May 8 and ended on December 7. For the first time, one club has won the championship three times in a row. Also, São Paulo has been crowned the biggest winner in the history of the competition, winning it six times since its establishment in 1971.

Format
For the sixth season, the championship was contested in a double round-robin system. The team with most points has been declared champions. Also, the tournament was a qualifier to other South American competitions:
 Copa Libertadores 2009: Top three clubs qualified for the First Stage. Team finishing in 4th will play Preliminary Round.
 Copa Sudamericana 2009: Teams finishing from 5th to 12th qualified for the first stage.
By winning the Copa do Brasil, Sport already qualified for Copa Libertadores 2009 First Stage and cannot qualify for the Copa Sudamericana 2009. Also, Internacional qualified for the Copa Sudamericana 2009 by winning the 2008 edition.

2008 teams

League table

Top scorers

Source:

References

 

Campeonato Brasileiro Série A seasons
1